Johann Wilhelm Schütze (September 1807, Hamburg – 24 July 1878, Berlin) was a German painter and art professor. His birth year is sometimes given as 1814, and the place as Berlin.

Life and work 
From 1847 to 1848, he worked with Carl Eggers, creating frescoes designed by Karl Friedrich Schinkel, in the hallway at the Altes Museum. Later, he was a professor at the Royal School of Art.

He was especially successful as a painter of genre scenes, from the lives of the rural farmers; with a preference for naïve, youthful characters. Many of his works were made into lithographs (and other prints) by himself and others, and issued in folio formats. These became widely popular. One of these prints by Richard Brend'amour (1831–1915) was published in the Illustrated London News in 1882.

References

Sources 
 Georg Kaspar Nagler: Neues allgemeines Künstler-Lexicon oder Nachrichten aus dem Leben und den Werken der Maler, Bildhauer, Baumeister, Kupferstecher, Formschneider, Lithographen, Zeichner, Medailleure, Elfenbeinarbeiter, etc., Vol.15. Fleischmann, Munich 1845, pg.50.
 Friedrich von Boetticher: Malerwerke des neunzehnten Jahrhunderts: Beitrag zur Kunstgeschichte. Vol.2, Boetticher, Dresden 1898, pg.686.
 "Schütze, Wilhelm (1814)". In: Hans Vollmer (Ed.): Allgemeines Lexikon der Bildenden Künstler von der Antike bis zur Gegenwart, Vol.30: Scheffel–Siemerding. E. A. Seemann, Leipzig 1936, pg.319

External links 

1807 births
1878 deaths
19th-century German painters
19th-century German male artists
German genre painters
Artists from Hamburg